Aretas William Overton Young  (9 February 1917 – 19 November 2003) was an Australian politician.

He was born in North Adelaide, South Australia. In 1959 he was elected to the Tasmanian House of Assembly as a Liberal member for Franklin. He held the seat until 1969, when he was defeated. Young died in Hobart in 2003.

References

1917 births
2003 deaths
Liberal Party of Australia members of the Parliament of Tasmania
Members of the Tasmanian House of Assembly
Australian Members of the Order of the British Empire
Politicians from Adelaide
20th-century Australian politicians